Ginkgo digitata is an extinct ginkgo species in the family Ginkgoaceae. It lived in Great Britain from the Aalenian to the Bathonian, in Queensland in the Callovian and in British Columbia in the Cenomanian.

References

digitata
Mesozoic trees